Mountlake Terrace Transit Center is a bus station and proposed light rail station in Mountlake Terrace, Washington.

In 2024, it will be served by an elevated light rail station on Sound Transit's Lynnwood Link Extension, part of the Link light rail system.

Location

Mountlake Terrace Transit Center is located adjacent to Interstate 5 at 236th Street SW. It is west of Mountlake Terrace's city center.

History

Community Transit opened a 400-stall park and ride lot at Interstate 5 and 236th Street Southwest on April 12, 1983. It was initially served by Community Transit and King County Metro commuter service, until the latter dropped service to Snohomish County in June 1989. The new lot regularly reached capacity beginning in the 1990s and was supplemented with leased spaces at three nearby churches to provide overflow parking. City officials proposed a garage with integrated housing and retail, but later dropped them from plans. Construction began in late 2007 with the closure of the existing lower lot, which was replaced by spaces leased from local businesses.

The parking garage at Mountlake Terrace Transit Center was dedicated on February 20, 2009, and opened three days later. The freeway flyer stop, located in the median of Interstate 5, opened on March 20, 2011. It was immediately served by Sound Transit Express and Community Transit commuter routes connecting Snohomish County to Downtown Seattle. The median flyer stop was first proposed in a 1996 report by Sound Transit and WSDOT. The garage was also planned as a precursor to a future light rail station, which was approved as part of Sound Transit 2 in 2008.

Light rail construction at the transit center began in September 2019, with the closure of the surface parking lot for construction staging. The light rail platforms will be built to the east of the bus bays and are scheduled to open in 2024 as part of the Lynnwood Link Extension, carrying the 1 Line and 2 Line. The freeway station bays were closed for five months beginning in July 2020 for light rail construction, with commuter routes bypassing Mountlake Terrace replaced by a temporary fare-free shuttle route to downtown.

The main bus loop at the transit center was closed in March 2021 and replaced with a temporary loop to the east of the future light rail station.

Transit-oriented development

The former site of the Evergreen Elementary School, just south of the station, will be redeveloped into a three-building complex with 600 apartments and retail spaces. The city government is also planning a "town center" in the area east of the light rail station.

Layout and services

Services

References

External links
Lynnwood Link Extension
Mountlake Terrace Freeway Station

Future Link light rail stations
Transportation buildings and structures in Snohomish County, Washington
Railway stations scheduled to open in 2024
Bus stations in Washington (state)
Sound Transit Express